Robin Ammerlaan and Stefan Olsson defeated the defending champion Stéphane Houdet and his partner Shingo Kunieda in the final, 6–4, 7–6(7–4) to win the gentlemen's doubles wheelchair tennis title at the 2010 Wimbledon Championships.

Houdet and Michaël Jérémiasz were the reigning champions, but Jérémiasz did not compete.

Seeds

  Stéphane Houdet /  Shingo Kunieda (final)
  Maikel Scheffers /  Ronald Vink (semifinals, third place)

Draw

Finals

External links
Draw

Men's Wheelchair Doubles
Wimbledon Championship by year – Wheelchair men's doubles